The List of Bohemian High Chancellors gives an overview of the Habsburg High Chancellors in Bohemia, between 1526 and 1749.

Bohemian High Chancellor 
In 1526, the Kingdom of Bohemia became part of Habsburg Austria. King Ferdinand I established the Bohemian Court Chancellery (Böhmische Hofkanzlei) with the High Supreme Chancellor at its head. He was responsible for the administration of the Lands of the Bohemian Crown.

Initially, the Bohemian Court Chancellery has a certain autonomy, but this decreased over the years.
The seat of this Court Chancellery was initially the Old royal palace in the Prague Castle. 
But after the Bohemian Revolt was suppressed in the Battle of the White Mountain in 1620, the Court Chancellery was transferred to Vienna and placed solely under the control of the Austrian King. In 1749 the Bohemian Court Chancellery was dissolved completely and organizationally merged with the Austrian Court Chancellery.

List of Chancellors 
 1526–1531 Adam I von Neuhaus (Adam I. z Hradce) 
 1531–1537 Johann Pflug von Rabenstein (Jan Pluh z Rabštejna)
 1538–1542 Wolfgang Kraiger von Kraigk
 1542–1554 Henry IV, Burgrave of Plauen
 1554–1565 Joachim von Neuhaus (Jáchym z Hradce) 
 1566–1582 Wratislaw von Pernstein 
 1583–1584 vacant 
 1585–1593 Adam II von Neuhaus (Adam II. z Hradce) 
 1594–1596 vacant 
 1597–1598 Georg Bořita von Martinitz  
 1599–1628 Zdenko Adalbert Poppel, Prince of Lobkowicz 
 1628–1652 Vilém Slavata of Chlum 
 1644–1651 George Adam Borzitza, Count of Martinitz (de facto since 1637)
 1652–1683 John Hartwig, Count of Nostitz 
 1683–1699 Francis, Count of Kinsky of Wchinitz and Tettau 
 1700–1705 John Francis, Count of Wrbna and Freudenthal  
 1705–1711 Wenceslaus Norbert, Count of Kinsky 
 1711–1712 Johann Wenzel Graf Wratislaw von Mitrowitz 
 1713–1723 Leopold Josef Graf Schlick 
 1723–1736 Francis Ferdinand, Count of Kinsky 
 1736–1738 Wilhelm Albrecht Graf Krakowsky von Kolowrat 
 1738–1745 Philip Kinsky of Wchinitz and Tettau  
 1745–1749 Friedrich August von Harrach-Rohrau

See also 
Supreme Burgrave of the Kingdom of Bohemia
Supreme Marshal of the Kingdom of Bohemia

References

Sources 
 Michael Hochedlinger, Petr Maťa, Thomas Winkelbauer (Hrsg.): Verwaltungsgeschichte der Habsburgermonarchie in der Frühen Neuzeit. Band 1: Hof und Dynastie, Kaiser und Reich, Zentralverwaltungen, Kriegswesen und landesfürstliches Finanzwesen. Böhlau Verlag, Wien 2019, ISBN 978-3-205-20766-5, Page 482 
 Thomas Fellner: Oberste böhmische Kanzler. In: Die österreichische Zentralverwaltung Geschichtliche Übersicht. Anhang. Verzeichnis der Inhaber der obersten Hofwürden und der Vorstände der Zentralbehörden.  Wien 1907 Page 282

Kingdom of Bohemia
History of Bohemia